Schineria is a genus of flies in the family Tachinidae.

Species
S. gobica Zimin, 1947
S. majae Zimin, 1947
S. tergestina Rondani, 1857

References

Tachininae
Tachinidae genera
Taxa named by Camillo Rondani